LAC Línea Aérea Cuencana was an airline based in Cuenca, Ecuador. In 2018, the airline ceased all operations.

Fleet
The Línea Aérea Cuencana fleet consists of the following aircraft (as of August 2016):

The airline previously operated the following aircraft:
 1 Bombardier CRJ700

References

External links

Official website
Facebook page

Defunct airlines of Ecuador
Airlines established in 2012
Airlines disestablished in 2018
2012 establishments in Ecuador
2010s disestablishments in Ecuador